Frederik Adeler (1764-1816) was a Dano-Norwegian noble and government official. He served as the County Governor and Diocesan Governor of several counties from 1802 until his death in 1816.

Family
Adeler was a son of Baron Conrad Wilhelm Adeler and Ulrika Helene de Cicignon. His paternal grandfather was Frederik Adeler.  On 1 July 1786, he married Berta Countess Moltke. They had a daughter, Sophie Hedevig baroness Adeler. He died suddenly in Copenhagen on 23 March 1816.

Career
In 1802 he was appointed Diocesan Governor of Trondhjems stiftamt as well as the County Governor of Trondhjems amt. After two years, he was transferred to Denmark as the County Governor of Holbæk County. In 1808 he became Diocesan Governor of the Diocese of Funen as well as the County Governor of Odense County. In 1804 he received the Grand Cross of the Order of the Dannebrog.

References

 

 

 

 

1764 births
1816 deaths
County governors of Norway